Upsilon Aurigae, Latinised from υ Aurigae, is the Bayer designation for a single star in the northern constellation of Auriga. It has an apparent visual magnitude of 4.74, which means it is bright enough to be seen with the naked eye. Based upon parallax measurements, this star is approximately  distant from the Earth. It is drifting further away with a radial velocity of +38 km/s.

This is an evolved red giant star with a stellar classification of M0 III. It is a suspected variable star and is currently on the asymptotic giant branch, which means it is generating energy through the fusion of helium along a shell surrounding a small, inert core of carbon and oxygen. The star is two billion years old with 1.64 times the mass of the Sun and has expanded to 61 times the Sun's radius.

References

External links
 HR 2011
 Image Upsilon Aurigae

M-type giants
Asymptotic-giant-branch stars

Auriga (constellation)
Aurigae, Upsilon
Durchmusterung objects
Aurigae, 31
038944
027639
2011